The Liquiñe River is a river in the Andes of Los Ríos Region, Chile. The river is most known for the many hotsprings the upwell at its middle reaches where the town of Liquiñe is currently placed.

See also
List of rivers of Chile

References
 EVALUACION DE LOS RECURSOS HIDRICOS SUPERFICIALES EN LA CUENCA DEL RIO BIO BIO

Rivers of Chile
Rivers of Los Ríos Region